Johns Creek is a stream in Jackson County, in the U.S. state of North Carolina.

The stream derives its name from Chief John, a Native American.

See also
List of rivers of North Carolina

References

Rivers of Jackson County, North Carolina
Rivers of North Carolina